Haaken Gulleson was a Swedish painter and workshop leader in the early 16th century. His signature is found on six sculptures in southern Norrland. He has long been considered to be solely a sculptor, but recent research has seen him as a painter. He ran a workshop where his apprentices contributed to his work.

Biography
He lived in Enånger parish in Gävleborg County, Sweden. His sculpture is in Enånger Old Church and is signed and dated in the year 1520. Another sculpture is a small Madonna image in the Bollnäs church. A signed Madonna is in Forsa Church and there is an altar screen in Njutånger Church. There is one in Bjuråker Church and in Hälsinglands museum.

References

Other sources
Lennart Karlsson (2005) Kretsen kring Haaken Gulleson (Förlag Carlsson) 

16th-century Swedish painters
Swedish male painters
Swedish male sculptors
Gothic sculptors